Unechsky (masculine), Unechskaya (feminine), or Unechskoye (neuter) may refer to:
Unechsky District, a district of Bryansk Oblast, Russia
Unechsky Urban Administrative Okrug, an administrative division which the town of Unecha and six rural localities in Unechsky District of Bryansk Oblast, Russia are incorporated as
Unechskoye Urban Settlement, a municipal formation which Unechsky Urban Administrative Okrug in Unechsky District of Bryansk Oblast, Russia is incorporated as